Tamil Nadu Veterinary and Animal Sciences University (TANUVAS) is a veterinary university founded in 1989 in Madhavaram Milk Colony, Chennai, India.  It is composed of the Madras Veterinary College, Vepery, Veterinary College and Research Institute, Namakkal, Veterinary College and Research Institute, Tirunelveli; Veterinary College and Research Institute, Orathanadu, Thanjavur and the Institute of Food and Dairy Technology, Koduvalli, Chennai-52. Research farms are for leprosy bacteria, for prawn and edible fish culture, and for animal feed safety.

History
The institution now operating as a university was established in 1876 and became a college in 1903, with 20 students at Dobbin Hall, Chennai.  The three-year diploma course, Graduate of Madras Veterinary College, was then offered.

The Government of Tamil Nadu established the university on 20 September 1989 through the Tamil Nadu Veterinary and Animal Sciences University Act, 1989 (Tamil Nadu Act 42 of 1989). Tamil Nadu Agricultural University's Faculty of Veterinary and Animal Sciences (i.e., Madras Veterinary College, Veterinary College and Research Institute, Namakkal and Fisheries College and Research Institute, Thoothukudi) formed the nucleus of university and the institutes became constituent colleges of the newly formed university.

Constituent colleges
The university has the following constituent colleges.

See also
 List of universities in India
 Universities and colleges in India
 Education in India
 Distance Education Council
 University Grants Commission (India)
 List of Tamil Nadu Government's Educational Institutions

References

External links
 TANUVAS Official website

1989 establishments in Tamil Nadu
Educational institutions established in 1989
Veterinary schools in India
Universities in Chennai
Animal research institutes